Forgandenny (Scottish Gaelic Forgrann Eithne, 'Over-Bog of Eithne' [an ancient female Gaelic name]) is a small village in Perth and Kinross, Scotland, located four miles south of Perth. Perth is a 20-minute bus ride from Forgandenny, and there is a regular Stagecoach service. It is 45 minutes from Edinburgh and one hour from Glasgow. There is a daily train service from Perth to London King's Cross.

Forgandenny has a church (of Norman origin, though the windows and doors are not original), village hall and a primary school. Its Post Office closed in 2020 after its owners for 32 years, Jim and Jacqueline Johnston, retired. "Everything is online," said Jim Johnston in April 2020. "The last few years all we have sold is sweets and soft drinks. It's time to put the feet up." The Post Office said it is committed to maintaining a branch in the village.

Near the village since 1920 is Strathallan School, a boarding school of approximately 550 pupils and 70 staff, many of whom live in Forgandenny.

Gregory Ross released a book called Forgandenny, a Place in History (Forgandenny: Triuirdarach Publishing ) on 1 December 2007. The book tells the story of the history of Forgandenny and also includes Aberdalgie, Pathstruie, West Dron and Pitkeathly.

Notable people
William Oliphant, Lord Newton
William Row

External links

Forgandenny, United Kingdom Page Falling Rain Genomics, Inc. 1996-2004
Forgandenny, a Place in History by Gregory Ross
Excerpt from the 1861 parochial directory for Fife and Kinross: Forgandenny
Kinross, Scotland: 1841 Census of the Parish of Forgandenny
Forgandenny, Perth and Kinross The Gazetteer for Scotland

References
Citations

Sources

Villages in Perth and Kinross